William J. Rea (February 21, 1920 – August 3, 2005) was a United States district judge of the United States District Court for the Central District of California.

Education and career

Born in Los Angeles, California, Rea received a Bachelor of Arts degree from Loyola Marymount University in Los Angeles, in 1942. He served in the United States Navy during World War II, from 1941 to 1946, achieving the rank of lieutenant commander. In 1949, he received a Bachelor of Laws from the University of Colorado Law School. Rea served in private practice, in Los Angeles from 1950 to 1964, then in Santa Ana, California from 1964 to 1968. In 1968, he became a Judge of the Superior Court of Los Angeles County, California, a position he held until 1984.

Federal judicial service

Rea was nominated by President Ronald Reagan on May 24, 1984, to a seat on the United States District Court for the Central District of California vacated by Judge Malcolm M. Lucas. He was confirmed by the United States Senate on June 15, 1984, and received his commission the same day. On March 31, 1998, he assumed senior status. Rea served in that capacity until his death, in Santa Monica, California, on August 3, 2005.

References

Sources
 

1920 births
2005 deaths
California state court judges
Judges of the United States District Court for the Central District of California
Superior court judges in the United States
United States district court judges appointed by Ronald Reagan
20th-century American judges
United States Navy officers
University of Colorado Law School alumni